The following lists events that happened during 1957 in Chile.

Incumbents
President of Chile: Carlos Ibáñez del Campo

Events

March
3 March – Chilean parliamentary election, 1957

April
2 April and 3 April - The so-called "battle of Santiago" takes place. Due to the economic crisis in the country, protests took place that left more than 20 dead and serious clashes with the police. In the last hours of April 3, President Carlos Ibáñez del Campo is forced to declare a state of siege and take the army out into the streets

July
24 July - Influenza outbreak in the port of Valparaíso. Between August and September it would expand to all of Chile.
28 July - Christian Democratic Party is founded.

October
5 October - In Valparaíso, UCV Televisión, the first Chilean television channel, begins its transmissions.

December
22 December – Two buses collide near San Antonio, killing 21.

Births
date unknown – Roberto Brodsky
3 January – Héctor Hoffens
13 July – Benedicto Villablanca
8 August – Roberto Rojas
25 August – Lizardo Garrido
2 November – Osvaldo Heriberto Hurtado Galeguillo
5 December – Raquel Argandoña
21 December – Roberto Cifuentes

Deaths
10 January – Gabriela Mistral, poet (born 1889)
9 April – Pedro Opaso (born 1876)
12 May – Guillermo Saavedra (born 1903)
10 July – Ernesto Chaparro (born 1901)
25 September – Max Westenhöfer (born 1871)

References 

 
Years of the 20th century in Chile
Chile